Halil İbrahim Eren (born 20 January 1956) is a Turkish former footballer who played as a striker. He spent his entire playing career in the Turkish Süper Lig, and joined a select few players with over 100 goals in the competition. He is an eight-time international for the Turkey national football team.

Professional career
Eren begun his football career in amateur football with Yılmazspor, Tekirdağspor, and finally Bandırmaspor. After impressing, he joined Boluspor where he became the star player, and became one of Turkey's most expensive transfers where he moved to Ankaragücü. He is strongly associated with Ankaragücü, with whom he became a coach with after retiring as a footballer.

Honours
Boluspor
Prime Minister's Cup (1): 1980-81

Gençlerbirliği
Turkish Federation Cup (1): 1986-87

References

External links
 
 
 TFF Manager Profile

1956 births
Living people
People from Tekirdağ
Turkish footballers
Turkish football managers
Turkey international footballers
Turkey youth international footballers
Association football forwards
Sakaryaspor footballers
Samsunspor footballers
Gençlerbirliği S.K. footballers
MKE Ankaragücü footballers
Boluspor footballers
MKE Ankaragücü managers
Süper Lig players